Trema tomentosa, commonly known as poison peach, is a shrub or tree in the family Cannabaceae native to the Indian subcontinent, south east Asia, through the islands of the south west Pacific, and the east coast and northern half of Australia.

Description
It blooms between October and April producing green-white flowers followed by black fruit. The evergreen tree has pubescent young branches. The light green, scabrous leaves have a ovate to lanceolate shape. The leaves are arranged alternately with serrated margins and have three veins at the base. The flowers are unisexual and are found on axillary cymes. The fruits and leaves are toxic to stock.

Taxonomy
The plant was first described as Celtis tomentosa by William Roxburgh in 1832, then to the current name by the botanist Hiroshi Hara in 1971.
The specific epithet is taken from the Latin word tomentose meaning covered with short or matted hairs that describes the surface covering of the leaves.
There are three different varieties of the plant:
 Trema tomentosa var. viridis
 Trema tomentosa var. aspera
 Trema tomentosa (Roxb.) H.Hara var. tomentosa

Distribution
The shrub is native to from India in the west through most of south east Asia to China in the west. It is found the through the islands of the south west Pacific including Indonesia, Borneo, New Guinea and New Caledonia.
In Australia, the species is found among vine thickets and tussock grasslands in the Kimberley region of Western Australia where it grows in skeletal sandy soils over laterite or sandstone. It is also found in Queensland, Victoria and New South Wales. It can be situated on the margins of forested areas.

References

External links
Trema tomentosa occurrence data from the Australasian Virtual Herbarium

tomentosa
Flora of Australia
Flora of tropical Asia
Flora of China
Flora of the Southwestern Pacific
Plants described in 1971